Janet Smith may refer to:
Janet Kennedy Smith (born 1902), murder victim in the Janet Smith case
Janet Adam Smith (1905–1999), Scottish writer, editor and literary journalist
Janet Smith (Rhodesia) (1915–1994), wife of Ian Smith, Prime Minister of Rhodesia
Janet Smith (judge) (born 1940), Lady Justice of Appeal of the Court of Appeal of England and Wales
Janet E. Smith (born 1950), professor of moral theology
Janet L. Smith (born 1951), American scientist
Janet Marie Smith, Major League Baseball executive, architect, and urban planner
Janet Marilyn Smith (1966-1994), American woman shot dead in the 1994 Gresham cat hostage taking incident
Janet Smith (athlete) (born 1968), British Olympic sprinter
Janet Smith, a character in Two Pints of Lager and a Packet of Crisps